Juan Luis González Calderón (born 16 Jun 1974) is a former Chilean footballer.

International career
González played for Chile B against England B on February 10, 1998. Chile won by 2-1. Later, he made five appearances for Chile from 2004 to 2005.

Managerial career
In 2021, he graduated as a Football Manager at the INAF (Football National Institute). Before he coached Deportes La Serena at under-16 level, winning the 2019 ANFP Youth Championship.

Personal life
He is nicknamed Limache due to the fact that he was born in that city.

Honours

Player
Deportes La Serena
 Primera B de Chile (1): 1996

Cobreloa
 Primera División de Chile (3): 2003 Apertura, 2003 Clausura, 2004 Clausura

Everton
 Primera División de Chile (1): 2008 Apertura

Manager
Deportes La Serena U16
 ANFP Youth Championship (1): 2019

References

External links
 BDFA profile

1974 births
Living people
People from Marga Marga Province
Chilean footballers
Chile international footballers
Deportes La Serena footballers
Everton de Viña del Mar footballers
Coquimbo Unido footballers
Cobreloa footballers
O'Higgins F.C. footballers
C.D. Antofagasta footballers
Chilean Primera División players
Primera B de Chile players
Association football defenders
People from Valparaíso Region
Chilean football managers